The Amazing Truth About Queen Raquela is a 2008 drama film directed by Olaf de Fleur Johannesson.

Premise
Raquela, a Filipino transsexual prostitute dreams of making a new life in Paris. She becomes an Internet porn star and meets Valerie, an Icelandic transsexual, and Michael, the owner of the website she works for.

Cast
Raquela Rios as Herself
Stefan Schaefer as Ardilo, Michael
Olivia Galudo as Olivia
Brax Villa as Aubrey
Valerie Grand Einarsson as Valerie Einarsson

Distribution and reception
The film showed at the 2008 Berlin International Film Festival where it won the Teddy Award for Best Feature Film. It has been screened in the Emerging Visions section of the 2008 South by Southwest festival in the United States.

It received the Grand Jury Prize in the 10th 2008 Cinemanila International Film Festival at Malacañan Palace's Kalayaan Hall.

References

External links
Official site
Official MySpace page

 

2008 films
2000s English-language films
2000s Icelandic-language films
Icelandic LGBT-related films
Philippine LGBT-related films
Films about trans women
Thai drama films
Thai-language films
Visayan-language films
2008 drama films
Films directed by Olaf de Fleur
LGBT-related drama films
2008 LGBT-related films
French LGBT-related films
2000s French films
Philippine drama films
Icelandic drama films
French drama films
Thai LGBT-related films
2008 multilingual films
Icelandic multilingual films
Philippine multilingual films
French multilingual films
Thai multilingual films